The Ankum Heights, also called the Fürstenau Hills (Fürstenauer Berge), are a ridge of hills up to 140 m high in the western part of the state of Lower Saxony on the North German Plain.

Geography 

The southeastern foothills of the ridge, which form the northwestern part of the North Teutoburg Forest-Wiehen Hills Nature Park reach almost as far as the Alfsee lake.

East of the Ankum Heights are the Damme Hills, to the southeast are the west-northwestern outliers of the Wiehen Hills, to the south is Tecklenburg Land and the northwestern outliers of the Teutoburg Forest, to the west the Lingen Heights and the Emsland, in the northwest the Hümmling and to the north the Oldenburg Münsterland.

Geology 
The Ankum Heights are part of a series of ice age end moraines from the early part of the Saale glaciation, the so-called Drenthe I stage. The Lingen Heights, the Damme Hills, the Kellenberg and the Brelinger Berg also belong to this push moraine, also called the Rehburg Phase, which can be dated to about 230,000 years ago. The Rehburg Hills by the lake of the Steinhuder Meer, are not, however, part of the moraine.

Together with their almost symmetrical counterpart, the Damme Hills, the Ankum Heights display the most marked glacial lobes of this push moraine. It filled the lowland bay of the Artland.

History 
Several tumuli indicate that the Ankum Heights were already occupied in prehistoric times.

Transport links 
The Ankum Heights may be reached from the B 68 federal road, which passes the ridge to the east, the B 218, which runs along the southwestern edge of the feature, the 214, which crosses it from west to east, and the B 402, which runs west of the Ankum Heights. A number of local  Landesstraßen and Kreisstraßen roads branch off the B roads and lead to the ridge.

Hills 

Waterbodies 

The rivers and streams in and near the Ankum Heights include the:

 Hase, passing the Ankum Heights to the east; an eastern tributary of the Ems
 Fürstenauer Mühlenbach, rises in the middle of the Heights; an eastern tributary of the Deeper Aa in the catchment area of the Großer Aa
 Ueffelner Aue, rises in the southeast of the Heights; southwestern tributary of the Hase
 Weeser Aa, rises in the southeast, upper course of the Halverder Aa in the catchment area of the Großer Aa

Villages 

Ridges of Lower Saxony
Forests and woodlands of Lower Saxony
Vechta (district)